Bahour taluk is one of four taluks in the Pondicherry District of the union territory of Puducherry. It comprises villages under Bahour and Nettapakkam Commune. Bahour taluk is further divided into three sub-taluks or s, viz. Bahour, Selliamedu and Nettapakkam.

References

External links
 North East Monsoon 2009 - Action Plan

Taluks of Puducherry
Puducherry district